The 1972 San Jose State Spartans football team represented California State University, San Jose during the 1972 NCAA University Division football season as a member of the Pacific Coast Athletic Association. The team was led by third year head coach DeWayne "Dewey" King. They played home games at Spartan Stadium in San Jose, California. The Spartans finished the season with a record of four wins, seven losses (4–7, 1–3 PCAA).

Schedule

Team players in the NFL
The following were selected in the 1973 NFL Draft.

Notes

References

San Jose State
San Jose State Spartans football seasons
San Jose State Spartans football